The Man of My Life is a French film directed by Zabou Breitman, written by Breitman and Agnès de Sacy, and produced by Philippe Godeau.  It was first released in 2006.

It stars Bernard Campan, Charles Berling, Léa Drucker and Jacqueline Jehanneuf.

Cast 
 Bernard Campan as Frédéric 
 Charles Berling as Hugo
 Léa Drucker as Frédérique
 Jacqueline Jehanneuf as Jacqueline
 Éric Prat as Guillaume
 Niels Lexcellent as Arthur
 Anna Chalon as Capucine
 Antonin Chalon as Mathieu
 Léocadia Rodriguez-Henocq as Jeanne
 Caroline Gonce as Ilse
 Aurélie Guichard as Lucinda
 Philippe Lefebvre as Benoît
 Angie David as Anne-Sophie
 Gabrielle Atger as Pauline

Critical response
Review aggregation website Rotten Tomatoes reported an approval rating of 47%, based on 19 reviews, with an average score of 5.75/10. At Metacritic, which assigns a normalized rating out of 100 to reviews from mainstream critics, the film received an average score of 52, based on 4 reviews, indicating "mixed or average reviews".

Accolades

References

External links
 

2006 films
2000s French-language films
French LGBT-related films
Pan-Européenne films
2006 LGBT-related films
2006 drama films
French drama films
Films directed by Zabou Breitman
2000s French films